St Ives West was an electoral division of Cornwall in the United Kingdom which returned one member to sit on Cornwall Council from 2013 to 2021. It was abolished at the 2021 local elections, being succeeded by St Ives West and Towednack.

Councillors

Extent
St Ives West represented the west part of the town of St Ives, the villages of Halsetown and Towednack as well as the hamlets of Amalveor, Georgia, and Trevalgan. Parts of Nancledra and Cripplesease were also included, with both being divided between the divisions of St Ives West and Ludgvan. It covered 1684 hectares in total.

Election results

2017 election

2013 election

References

Electoral divisions of Cornwall Council
St Ives, Cornwall